Rejoice is an album by contemporary Christian music band 2nd Chapter of Acts released in 1981.

Track listing
From Discogs.

All songs were written by Annie Herring, except "Bread of Life", "Rise Up and Take a Bow" and "Bread of Life (Reprise)", which were written by Annie Herring and Matthew Ward.

 Rejoice – 3:00
 Bread of Life – 2:04
 Nobody Can Take My Life – 3:28
 Here I Go – 2:18
 Rise Up and Take a Bow – 2:00
 I've Got a Break in My Heart – 2:47
 Don't Understand It – 2:57
 He's My Source – 2:23
 Heaven Came to Earth – 2:15
 Will You Remember Me – 3:25
 Mountain Tops – 2:54
 Bread of Life (Reprise) – 1:08

Personnel 

2nd Chapter of Acts
 Annie Herring – acoustic piano, synthesizers, vocals
 Nelly Ward – vocals
 Matthew Ward – vocals

Musicians
 Kerry Livgren – pianos, synthesizers, guitars 
 Greg Springer – synthesizers
 Peter York – guitars
 Herb Melton – bass
 Jack Kelly – drums
 David Kemper – drums

Production 
 Buck Herring – producer, engineer
 Ron Brent – graphics, layout 
 David J. Pavol – photography

References

1981 albums
2nd Chapter of Acts albums